The Philadelphia Rebels are a Tier II junior ice hockey team playing in the North American Hockey League (NAHL). The team is based in Hollydell Ice Arena in Washington Township, Gloucester County, New Jersey.

History
The franchise was originally known as the Wenatchee Wild in Wenatchee, Washington, before relocating to Hidalgo, Texas, to become the Rio Grande Valley Killer Bees.

On June 1, 2015, NAHL insiders began reporting the Killer Bees franchise was going to relocate to Philadelphia suburb of Aston, Pennsylvania, and the IceWorks Skating Complex. The Killer Bees would subsequently announce that the team was ceasing operations for the 2015–16 season unless the team president, Gilbert Saenz, could find a local alternative to save the team. However, on June 9, the NAHL announced that the franchise was relocating to become the Aston Rebels. Joe Coombs remains as the head coach. The Rebels were placed in the NAHL's new East Division for their inaugural season.

In 2017, the team relocated to the Class of 1923 Arena at the University of Pennsylvania in nearby Philadelphia and became the Philadelphia Rebels. The Philadelphia Rebels again finished at the top of their division in the regular season before losing to the Wilkes-Barre/Scranton Knights in the division finals of the playoffs. After one season, the Rebels faced poor attendance numbers and scheduling issues. In June 2018, the team was relocated to Northwest Arena in Jamestown, New York and became the Jamestown Rebels. The Rebels are the second NAHL team to play in Jamestown after the Jamestown Ironmen ceased operations in 2013.

Due to the on-going restrictions in the midst of the COVID-19 pandemic in the state of New York, the team suspended operations for the 2020–21 season.

On May 17, 2022, the NAHL announced that it had sold the franchise to another owner and was relocating the Rebels back to suburban Philadelphia, playing out of Hollydell Ice Arena in Washington Township, Gloucester County, New Jersey.

Season-by-season records

Notes

External links
Rebels website
NAHL website

Ice hockey teams in Pennsylvania
North American Hockey League teams
Ice hockey clubs established in 2015
Rebels